Lechriopini is a tribe of true weevils in the beetle family Curculionidae. There are more than 20 genera and 510 described species in Lechriopini.

Genera
These 26 genera belong to the tribe Lechriopini:

 Balaninurus Heller, 1895
 Copturomimus Heller, 1895
 Copturomorpha Champion, 1906
 Copturus Schönherr, 1825
 Coturpus R.S. Anderson, 1994
 Crassocopturus Rheinheimer, 2011
 Cylindrocopturinus Sleeper, 1963
 Damurus Heller, 1895
 Eulechriops Faust, 1896
 Euzurus Champion, 1906
 Hoplocopturus Heller, 1895
 Lechriops Schönherr, 1825
 Machaerocnemis Heller, 1895
 Macrocopturus Heller, 1895
 Macrolechriops Champion, 1906
 Microzurus Heller, 1895
 Microzygops Champion, 1906
 Mnemyne Pascoe, 1880
 Mnemynurus Heller, 1895
 Paramnemyne Heller, 1895
 Paramnemynellus Hustache, 1932
 Poecilogaster Heller, 1895
 Psomus Casey, 1892
 Rhinolechriops Hustache, 1939
 Tachylechriops Heller, 1895
 Turcopus R.S. Anderson, 1994

References

Further reading

External links

 

Weevils